Mating pattern may refer to:
Checkmate pattern, a game-winning arrangement of chess pieces
Mating system, sexual reproductive behavior within a group of organisms